The New Masonic Temple is a historic building in St. Louis, Missouri, built in 1926.  Like many other buildings built for Freemason meeting places, it shows Classical Revival architecture.

Named a city landmark in 1976, the 386,000-square-foot building stands 185 feet high and encloses more than six million cubic feet. There are 14 levels: six full floors and eight mezzanines. 

The Temple's ground was broken in 1923 and dedicated in 1926. Created by architectural company Eames & Young with consulting architect Albert B. Groves, it features classic Greek Ionic-style exterior architecture with various styles throughout the interior.

The Masonic Temple is built in three receding stages, symbolic of the three steps in Masonry. Constructed of Bedford limestone with gray granite trim, the main lobby is finished in marble; other rooms have their original wool carpet. The building has an unfinished theater with 2,200 seats.

The lobby contains a 38-foot mural titled “The Origins of Freemasonry”, which was created in 1941 by African American artist Jessie Housley Holliman. Dedicated by Senator Harry S. Truman, it is the only surviving mural by the noted artist in a St. Louis public building.

Then-Senator and Freemason Grand Master Harry S. Truman kept an office in the building. Charles A. Lindbergh was initiated and participated as a mason at the Temple before his renowned 1927 flight. In 1980, Escape from New York with Ernest Borgnine filmed a scene on the Temple's steps. Borgnine, a Mason, attended Masonic meetings in the building.

The ground and first floors and the first-floor mezzanine have areas where the general public is admitted only on days when a meeting is held, which is currently 10 per month. The second floor contains the Eastern Star quarters. Third and fourth floors and their mezzanines were designed to house the Blue Lodges with the potential for eight Blue Lodge halls. The four halls and the fourth floor were not completed, and one area on the third floor was made into a dining room.

Fifth and sixth floors were designed to house three of the York Rite organizations, which are known as the Chapter, Council, and the Commandery. Most of the building is non-sectarian, but the fifth floor features Christian symbolism. The fifth level hall is 100’ long, 75’ wide and 48’ high.

See also
 Moolah Temple of the Mystic Shrine, at 3821 Lindell Boulevard, completed in 1912
 Scottish Rite Cathedral (St. Louis), at 3627 Lindell Boulevard, completed in 1924

References

External links
Webpage about the history of the Lindell neighborhood
German Wikipedia article

Buildings and structures in St. Louis
Neoclassical architecture in Missouri
Landmarks of St. Louis
Masonic buildings completed in 1926
Masonic buildings in Missouri
Midtown St. Louis
1926 establishments in Missouri